Kabutarlan (also Romanized as Kabūtarlān; also known as Kabūtarān, Kabūtarīān, Kammūtalān, and Kamūtalān) is a village in Valanjerd Rural District, in the Central District of Borujerd County, Lorestan Province, Iran. At the 2006 census, its population was 174, in 41 families.

References 

Towns and villages in Borujerd County